Beta-galactofuranosidase (exo-beta-galactofuranosidase, exo-beta-D-galactofuranosidase, beta-D-galactofuranosidase) is an enzyme with systematic name beta-D-galactofuranoside hydrolase. This enzyme catalyses the following chemical reaction

 Hydrolysis of terminal non-reducing beta-D-galactofuranosides, releasing [galactose]

The enzyme from Helminthosporium sacchari detoxifies helminthosporoside.

References

External links 
 

EC 3.2.1